Castelnuovo di Farfa is a  (municipality) in the Province of Rieti in the Italian region of Latium, located about  northeast of Rome and about  southwest of Rieti.

References

Cities and towns in Lazio